The 1916 United States presidential election in New Mexico took place on November 7, 1916. All contemporary forty-eight states were part of 1916 United States presidential election. Voters chose three electors to represent them in the Electoral College, which voted for President and Vice President.

Background
During the period between New Mexico's annexation by the United States and statehood, the area was divided between largely Republican machine-run highland regions and its firmly Southern Democrat and Baptist "Little Texas" region to the southeast. A split in the "Old Guard" of highland Republicanism meant that in the state's inaugural presidential election in 1912 Woodrow Wilson carried the state through overwhelming "Little Texas" and southern desert support over Progressive Theodore Roosevelt and incumbent Republican William Howard Taft. Nonetheless, New Mexico was still Taft's fourth-strongest state by vote percentage reflecting the strong Hispanic machine loyalties to him in the northern highlands.

In the East, supporters of Theodore Roosevelt's "Bull Moose" Party rapidly returned to the Republicans, in the Mountain States many if not most of these supporters turned to the Democratic Party not only in presidential elections, but also in state and federal legislative ones. Wilson was also helped by a powerful "peace vote" in the Western states due to opposition to participation in World War I.

Vote
New Mexico was won by incumbent President Woodrow Wilson, who secured a tumultuous reelection against Supreme Court Justice Charles Evans Hughes, and Socialist Party icon Allan L. Benson. Wilson's reluctance to bid armed forces in World War I improved his image for this election, as a "peace candidate". However, whilst many Progressive business leaders believed the Republican Old Guard stood for fraud and dishonesty, they nonetheless supported Hughes even whilst opposing GOP candidates for other statewide positions. Consequently, despite its strong Democratic base at a local level that was completely absent in most parts of the West during the "System of 1896", New Mexico was Wilson's third-weakest state in the West.

Results

Results by county

References

New Mexico
1916 New Mexico elections
1916